Vinci  may refer to:

Places
Vinci, Tuscany, a comune in the Province of Florence, Italy
Vinci (Golubac), a community in Braničevo District, Serbia

People
Alessandro Vinci (born 1987), Italian footballer
Alessio Vinci (born 1968), Italian journalist
Carlo Vinci (1906–1993), American animator
Charles Vinci (1933–2018), American weightlifter
Giovanni Vinci (born 1990), Italian professional wrestler
Leonardo Vinci (1690–1730), Italian composer
Leonardo da Vinci (1452-1519), Italian polymath
Pietro Vinci (fl. 1525–1584), Italian composer
Roberta Vinci (born 1983), Italian tennis player
Sarah Vinci (born 1991), Australian wheelchair basketball player
Sonia Vinci (born 1971), Australian journalist
Vinci, stage name of Vincy Chan (born 1982), Hong Kong singer
Vinci Montaner (born 1976), Filipino singer

Arts and entertainment
Vinci (board game), a French board game
Vinci (film), a 2004 Polish movie
Vinci (play), a 2002 play by Canadian playwright Maureen Hunter
Vinci (Rise of Legends), a civilization in the American computer game Rise of Nations: Rise of Legends

Other uses
Benelli Vinci, a semi-automatic shotgun
Vinci (automobile), a Portuguese car
Vinci SA, a French company that specialises in concessions and construction
Vinci (rocket engine), a European rocket engine

See also
Da Vinci (disambiguation)
Vincy (disambiguation)